The artist Loren Munk (born 1951) is primarily known for his YouTube nickname James Kalm as an uploader of videos about New York exhibitions, amongst others. He presents himself as a maker of contemporary paintings for several decades and of cubistic paintings of urban imagery. Munk has received accolades for his drawings and mosaics. He differs from traditional mosaic artists by the manner in which he incorporates glass into his decorative paintings.

Career debut
Munk's work debuted in SoHo in 1981 with a double show at J. Fields Gallery and Gabrielle Bryers. Since then, he has overseen an international career. In addition to exhibiting in Brazil, France, Germany and the United States, Munk has received national and overseas, public and private commissions. He is well represented in important collections throughout Europe, South and North America and the Middle East.

Recent work
Most recently, Munk has been producing a series of paintings which tackle the subject of art itself through a historical and diagrammatic lens. Also, he has expanded upon his role in the artistic community, publishing numerous reviews and essays, curating and promoting several shows, and offering his acknowledged expertise on the Williamsburg arts scene.

Munk documents the New York art world in YouTube videos, using the name James Kalm. The Kalm Report is shot from a first person perspective using a hand held camera. Kalm arrives at an art show by bike — he calls himself "the guy on the bike" — and then walks through the show while providing commentary.

References

External links 
www.lorenmunk.com
www.artnet.com
www.damstuhltrager.com
Art videos

20th-century American painters
American male painters
21st-century American painters
Art Students League of New York alumni
Art Students League of New York people
American art critics
American art historians
Living people
1951 births
Historians from New York (state)
20th-century American male artists